This is a list of business schools in Washington, D.C.

References

 
Washington, D.C.